Lassia-Tuolu Senior High School, (founded in 1995) is located in the Western part of Wa in the Upper West Region of Ghana.
Lassia-Tuolu Senior High school was originally named, St. Ignatius of Loyola Senior High school. Found in a community called Lassia-Tuolu, the school was nicknamed after it. Lassia-Tuolu Senior High School is a mixed sex catholic school with great academic merits and popularity in the Upper West Region. With their motto, Endurance, Truth, and Wisdom, Lassia-Tuolu Senor High school has attained great successes from 1995 till date.

History 
The school was established on 3 March 1995 by a Catholic church with Archbishop Emeritus Gregory Kpiebaya who was the Bishop of Wa in the 1980s. The initial idea was from the chief of Jenebob at that time to cater for the educational need of the youth in that locality. With financial support from a parish in Germany called St. Ignatius and the parish chairman, Bernhard Nistchke, the construction work was started in 1992.The school finally started on 3 March 1995 with one hundred and twenty students (120) comprising 80 boys and 40 girls. This was the first time the Upper West Region had a mixed catholic school. The school was formally captured into the public system in 1997. The continuous support of the Parent-Teacher Association (P.T.A) in providing the students with three meals a day helped the school to enroll students in the boarding house from 1997. Currently, the school has a population of about thousand students and a staff of 70.

Vision 
As a catholic educational institution that is inspired by the distinguished example of our lord Jesus Christ, who came to serve but not to be served, Lassia-Tuolu senior high desires to have well educated and trained youth who are self-disciplined, based on sound Christian morals for their own benefit and for the nation.

Mission
To Produce Intelligent, Self-Disciplined and Resourceful People Through Quality Education and Christian Moral Training Who Will Give Off Their Best to Society.

Motto
Endurance, Truth, and Wisdom.

Location
The school is found between Dorimon and Tanduori in the Wa West District of Ghana. Though the location of Lassia-Tuolu has not been captured in the Global Positioning System yet, Dorimon and Tanduori can help find the location of the school. It has a position of longitude 40N to 245N and latitude 9W to 32W.location of Lassia

Houses
The school has four houses which are Bill Curran, Bernhard Nitscke, Joseph Yieleh Chireh, and Kpan House respectively. These houses were named after people who contributed to the success of the school in several ways. 
 Rev. Bill Curran was the parish priest of Lassia-Tuolu who mobilized funds from friends outside the country to support Archbishop Emeritus Gregory Kpiebaya to establish the school. Due to his indispensable help to the school, the first house was named after him as a sign of acknowledgement. Bill Curran house is identified with yellow as their colour.
 Bernhard Nitschke was also a man from Germany who served as the fundraising manager for the school building project. He helped raise funds to build the old dining hall, the library, dormitories and old classrooms. In order to appreciate his efforts, house two was named after him. House two has always been identified with colour green.
 Joseph Yieleh Chireh is the current Member of Parliament for the Wa West District. He also played a significant role in the establishment of the school after he was elected as the member of Parliament for Wa West District. He helped in the funding process. He also donated a photocopier machine to the school and financed the building of the new library. So, house three was named after him to honour his good works. Yieleh Chireh house is identified with blue colour.
 Mr Andrew Kpan, who was the first headmaster of St. Ignatius of Loyola Senior high school from 1995 to 2005 was also acknowledged by naming the fourth house in his name. The last house, Andrew Kpan house represents the white colour.

Learning Environment
Since the school is located in a very remote area, there is serenity and less of distractions during learning. Aside from the fact that other factors cause disruption of classes and effective learning, the quiet nature and the isolated geographical area of the school is perfect for studies. The factors that hinder conducive studies are the water shortages, inconsistent electrical supply, few teachers for a subject. There are times the whole school with a population of over 1000 students rely on one borehole for water. This disrupted classes a lot especially for the first years because they had to go to the nearby village to get water and came back after very long hours. Subjects like Geography and Chemistry had only one teacher teaching the entire students offering those courses. This puts pressure on the teachers and the students causing a reduction in their academic performance.

Courses Offered
 General Arts 
 General Science
 Home Economics

Achievements
Maintaining high academic performance since 1995
Reduction of school debt through prudent financial management
Maintaining high standard of discipline among students and staff

Principals and Heads
 Mr. Andrew Kpan (1995-2005)
 Rev. Fr Linus Mwinlaaro (2005-2010)
 Rev. Fr Mathew Tuurosung (2010 till date)

Facilities
 Classrooms
 Computer Laboratory
 Library
 Science Laboratory

Gallery

See also 
 List of senior high schools in Ghana
Wa West District

References

High schools in Ghana
Upper West Region
Mixed schools in Ghana
Educational institutions established in 1995
Boarding schools in Ghana
Christian schools in Ghana
1995 establishments in Ghana